Lethal(3)malignant brain tumor-like protein is a protein that in humans is encoded by the L3MBTL gene.

This gene encodes the homolog of a protein identified in Drosophila as a suppressor of malignant transformation of neuroblasts and ganglion mother cells in the optic centers of the brain. This gene product is localized to condensed chromosomes in mitotic cells. Overexpression of this gene in a glioma cell line results in improper nuclear segregation and cytokinesis producing multinucleated cells. Alternatively spliced transcript variants encoding different isoforms have been identified.

References

Further reading

External links